Veliko Tarnovo is a province in the middle of the northern part of Bulgaria. Its capital city, Veliko Tarnovo, is of historical significance as it is known as the capital of the Bulgarian Empire. The province is divided into 10 municipalities with a total population, as of December 2009, of 275,395 inhabitants.

Other towns in the province include Gorna Oryahovitsa, which is within  of Veliko Tarnovo, Svishtov, set on Danube River and famous for its Tsenov Academy of Economics, and Suhindol, the hometown of Lovico — an internationally recognised label for fine wines and spirits. Another notable place is the village of Arbanasi, set between Veliko Tarnovo and Gorna Oryahovitsa. The combination of old style and modern architecture, as well as its churches and monasteries, present the spirit of Bulgaria. Real estate is among the most expensive in the country.

Municipalities

The Veliko Tarnovo oblast contains 10 municipalities. The following table shows the names of each municipality in English and Cyrillic, the main town (in bold) or village, and the population of each as of December 2009.

Demographics

The following table represents the change of the population in the province after World War II:

Ethnic groups

Total population (2011 census): 258 494 

Ethnic groups (2011 census):
Identified themselves: 233,992 persons:
Bulgarians: 211 353 (90,32%)
Turks:  15 709 (6,71%)
Romani: 3 875 (1,65%)
Others and indefinable: 3 055 (1,31%)
A further 25,000 persons in the Province did not declare their ethnic group at the 2011 census.

Religion

Religious adherence in the province according to 2001 census:

Geography

Climate

See also
Provinces of Bulgaria
Municipalities of Bulgaria
List of cities and towns in Bulgaria
List of villages in Veliko Tarnovo Province

References

External links
Official website
Tsenov Academy of Economics

 
Provinces of Bulgaria